Wade-Walker Park is a 177-acre park with sports fields, hiking and biking trails, pavilions, and a fishing pier near Stone Mountain, Georgia, United States. In 2005, the park underwent  a $2.5 million upgrade. The park is located at 5585 Rockbridge Road, at the intersection of Rockbridge with Stone Mountain Lithonia Road.

Athletics 
Wade-Walker Park is home to many sports and activities for the youth of the Stone Mountain and surrounding areas such as football, soccer, and cheer-leading.

References

Geography of DeKalb County, Georgia